B. J. Medical College (Byramjee Jeejabhoy Medical College) is a medical college situated in Ahmedabad, Gujarat India. Dr. Kalpesh A. Shah is the current dean of B.J. Medical College. It is affiliated to Gujarat University and Ahmedabad Civil Hospital. The college has a modern library with around 500-600 students capacity. The college is part of civil hospital Ahmedabad which is one of Asia's largest hospitals with more than 7000 beds.

History
Ahmedabad Medical School affiliated with Ahmedabad Civil Hospital was established in 1871. The school had 14 students educating in hospital assistant training. Businessman Byramjee Jeejeebhoy donated  in 1879 and the school was renamed after him, B. J. Medical School. In 1917, the school was affiliated with the College of Physicians & Surgeons of Bombay. Later it became B. J. Medical College and was affiliated with the University of Bombay granting Licentiate Certified Physician and Surgeon (LCPS) degree. It was affiliated to the Gujarat University for undergraduate courses in 1951 and postgraduate courses in 1956.

Notable alumni

Tejas Patel, cardiologist 
Hargovind Laxmishanker Trivedi, nephrologist, immunologist and transplant surgeon
A. K. Patel, politician and physician
Ketan Desai, urologist
Janak Desai, urologist
Rajni Kanabar, Tanzanian doctor and philanthropist
Kirit Premjibhai Solanki, surgeon and politician

References

External links
 

Medical colleges in Gujarat
Universities and colleges in Ahmedabad
Gujarat University